Janusz Andrzej Pęcherz (born 6 November 1954) is a Polish politician. He was elected to the Senate of Poland (10th term) representing the constituency of Kalisz. He graduated from the Faculty of Chemistry at the Lodz University of Technology. In 2002, he was elected president of Kalisz. In the 2006 local government elections, he successfully ran for re-election, running with the support of several local parties and winning the first round. In 2010, he again won the third term in the first round with about 51% of the vote. In 2014, he was not re-elected for another term. In 2018, he was appointed a city councilor in Kalisz, and then became the head of the city council.

References 

Living people
1954 births
Place of birth missing (living people)
20th-century Polish politicians
21st-century Polish politicians
Members of the Senate of Poland 2019–2023
Łódź University of Technology alumni